Boomerang effect may refer to:

 Boomerang effect (psychology) in social psychology
 Imperial boomerang in sociology and political science
 Unintended consequences in general